The Iranian Volleyball Super League 2019–20 was the 33rd season of the Iranian Volleyball Super League, the highest professional volleyball league in Iran. The season started on 30 October 2019, and ran through 23 February 2020. But due to COVID-19 pandemic in Iran, IRIVF announced on 1 March 2020 that the season was canceled. According to the announcement, there was no relegation to lower division and teams ranked 1st to 3rd in previous season were nominated to participate in the 2020 Asian Club Championship. However, the 2020 Asian Club Championship was also canceled later.

Regular season

Standings

Payam Mashhad were excluded from the league during the regular season due to financial problems. All results were declared null and void.

Results

References

External links
Iran Volleyball Federation

League 2019-20
Iran Super League, 2019-20
Iran Super League, 2019-20
Volleyball League, 2019-20
Volleyball League, 2019-20
Iranian Volleyball Super League